The Big Waste is an American cooking competition television special that aired on Food Network on January 8, 2012. Two two-chef teams (Anne Burrell/Alex Guarnaschelli and Bobby Flay/Michael Symon) competed to cook the best meal using foods that were on their way to being discarded. All of the foods that were used were inspected before the chefs utilized them.

References

External links
 

2010s American television specials
2012 in American television
2012 television specials
Food Network television specials